The 1949 Duke Blue Devils football team represented the Duke Blue Devils of Duke University during the 1949 college football season.

Schedule

References

Duke
Duke Blue Devils football seasons
Duke Blue Devils football